"Vision of You" is a song by American singer Belinda Carlisle, released as the fifth single from her third solo album, Runaway Horses (1989). The song was released on May 14, 1990, in the United Kingdom and reached number 41. A year later, it was remixed and re-released on 12-inch vinyl with a live version of "Heaven Is a Place on Earth", but this release charted lower, at number 71.

Critical reception
Paul Lester from Melody Maker felt that Carlisle "comes on all overblown and bombastic just when pop decided to rid itself of all fleshy excess and fussy baggage (re-house, acid, etc). Belinda's almost Beatles-esque attention towards the elaborate flourish, and a steadfast refusal to swop meandering patterns for a simplistic crash-bang-wallop, must surely be applauded." In 1991, pan-European magazine Music & Media wrote, "Now that rumours are spreading about a reunion of the Go-Go's, this re-release of an old Carlisle solo record will kill time. The slow, catchy melody will provide a moment of peace on EHR stations." Peter Stanton from Record Mirror viewed the song as a "mellow number [that] is idly going nowhere."

Music video
A music video was produced to promote the single, featuring both live footage of the song's performance and tour material shot during her Asian tour.

Track listings
 7-inch, cassette, and mini-CD single
 "Vision of You" (7-inch version)
 "Leave a Light On" (Kamikazee mix)
 The US cassette single contains blank tape on the B-side.

 12-inch and CD single
 "Vision of You" (7-inch version)
 "Leave a Light On" (Kamikazee mix)
 "I Feel Free" (12-inch extended mix)

 1991 12-inch single
A. "Vision of You" (Remix '91)
B. "Heaven Is a Place on Earth" (live)

Charts

Cover versions
 In 1992, American singer Jennifer Rush recorded the song for her Jennifer Rush album. It was released as a single in Europe in 1993 and was also recorded in Spanish.
 In 1993, a cover was recorded and released by Tony Award-winning musical actress Lea Salonga. The song appeared on her self-titled album the same year.

References

1990 singles
1990 songs
Belinda Carlisle songs
Jennifer Rush songs
MCA Records singles
Song recordings produced by Rick Nowels
Songs written by Ellen Shipley
Songs written by Rick Nowels
Virgin Records singles